Anne Ryan Haney ( Thomas; March 4, 1934 – May 26, 2001) was an American stage and screen actress. She was best known for her roles in Mrs. Doubtfire and Liar Liar, as well as Alberta Meechum on the sitcom Mama's Family.

Early years 
Haney was born to Robert Lee Thomas and Dorothy  (née Ryan) Thomas in Memphis, Tennessee.

Career 

Haney began acting in 1970, appearing in commercials and in local theatrical productions in Atlanta, Jacksonville, and Norfolk, Virginia.

Haney appeared in the Star Trek: The Next Generation episode "The Survivors" as Rishon Uxbridge, and later appeared as a Bajoran arbitrator in the Star Trek: Deep Space Nine episode "Dax". She was a regular guest-star during the syndicated run of Mama's Family, playing Alberta Meechum, the nemesis of Thelma Harper. On Our House she played fussy neighbour Virginia Taft. She was also a recurring cast member of L.A. Law, playing Judge Marilyn Travelini. She guest starred on Benson, Cheers, Designing Women, The Golden Girls, Charmed, Boy Meets World, Columbo, ER, Curb Your Enthusiasm and Ally McBeal. In 1993, she was cast as Mrs. Sellner in Mrs. Doubtfire. Four years later, she played Greta in Liar Liar.

Personal life 
She was married to John Haney, a public television executive whom she met at the University of North Carolina at Chapel Hill, where she had been studying drama, radio, and television. They had a daughter.

Death 
Haney died of congestive heart failure, aged 67, at her home in Los Angeles on May 26, 2001.

Selected filmography 

 Hopscotch (1980) – Mrs. Myerson
 The Night the Lights Went Out in Georgia (1981) – Waitress
 The Children Nobody Wanted (1981, made-for-television) – Mrs. Lightheart
 Making Love (1982) – Lila
 Some Kind of Hero (1982) – Monica Lewis
 Frances (1982) – Hairdresser
 Cheers (1982) – Miss Gilder
 The Osterman Weekend (1983) – Honeymoon Bride
  Benson (1984) - as the Nun
 Impulse (1984) – Mrs. Piersall
 The Night They Saved Christmas (1984) – Hedda
 The Bad Seed (1985) – Alice Fern
 Lime Street (1985) – Evelyn Camp
 Malice in Wonderland (1985) – Dema's Secretary
 Mr. Belvedere (1985, Episode "Sweet Charity") – Molly
 The Best of Times (1986) – Marcy
 The Golden Girls (1986) – Bonnie
 Blind Justice (1986) – Jim's mother
 The Twilight Zone (1986, Episode "The Toys of Caliban") – Mary Ross
 Cold Steel (1987) – Anna Modine
 Our House (1988) – Virginia Taft
 Elvis and Me (1988) – Grandma Minnie Mae Presley
 Beauty and the Beast Episode "Dead of Winter" (1988) - Tamara
 Star Trek: The Next Generation (1989) – Rishon Uxbridge
 Quantum Leap  (1991, Episode "A Single Drop of Rain") – Grace Beaumont
 Northern Exposure (1992) – Judge Elizabeth Percy
 The Golden Palace (1992) – Vivian
 Star Trek: Deep Space Nine (1993) – Renora
 Mrs. Doubtfire (1993) – Mrs. Sellner
 The American President (1995) – Mrs. Chapil
 Mother (1996) – Helen
 NYPD Blue (1996, Episode "Head Case") – Mrs. Reese
 Liar Liar (1997) – Greta
 Changing Habits (1997) – Sister Humiliata
 Midnight in the Garden of Good and Evil (1997) – Margaret Williams
 The Lesser Evil (1998) – Derek's Mother
 Psycho (1998) – Mrs. Chambers
 Forces of Nature (1999) – Emma
 The Out-of-Towners (1999) – Woman in Bathroom
 Charmed (2000, Episode "How to Make a Quilt Out of Americans") – Aunt Gail
 Curb Your Enthusiasm'' (2000, Episode "Ted and Mary") – Mary's Mother (final appearance)

References

External links 
 
 

1934 births
2001 deaths
University of North Carolina at Chapel Hill alumni
Actresses from Memphis, Tennessee
American film actresses
American stage actresses
American television actresses
20th-century American actresses
21st-century American actresses
Deaths from congestive heart failure